Borinic acid, also known as boronous acid, is  an oxyacid of boron with formula .

Borinic acid can be formed as the first step in the hydrolysis of diborane:

BH3 + H2O → H2BOH + H2

Borinic acid itself is unstable and only lasts for a few seconds during the hydrolysis reaction. However, by using microwave spectroscopy various properties can be determined. The B-O distance is 1.352 Å, O-H distance 0.96 Å, B-H length is probably 1.2 Å.  The angle between bonds at the oxygen atom BOH = 112° and the angles at boron are cis-HBO 121°, and trans-HBO = 117°.  The dipole moment is 1.506 Debye.

Borinic acid can form esters such as methoxyborane. This too is unstable only lasting about ten seconds. It can be formed by heating diborane and methanol gas together.

By substituting organic components instead of hydrogen, more generic borinic acids (containing RR'BOH) or borinic esters (RR'BOR") can be formed. Esters will tend to be stable in acidic conditions, but in alkaline conditions the boron atom can gain a negative charge and attach two hydroxyl groups, or two ester bonds. RR'B−(OH)2 or RR'B−(OR")2.  The anionic borinate ion can very easily form esters with diols such as ethylene glycol or sugars.

Naming
The IUPAC name borinic acid is a unique name for the acid.  The anhydrides are named diboroxanes, H2BOBH2, as the base compound and H being able to be substituted, e.g. tetraethyldiboroxane, as the anhydride for diethylborinic acid. Organic naming standard in the Bluebook allows skeletal replacement naming where the name is shorter, 3-borapentan-3-ol versus diethyl borinic acid. The grouping -BH-O-BH2 is called diboroxanyl.  Substituting sulfur for oxygen gives borinothioic acid (H2BSH). (Dimethylboranyl)oxy is used for the group (CH3)2B-O− and methyl(hydroxy)boranyl for the grouping CH3B(OH)-.

Formation
There are several ways to produce substituted borinic acids.

Firstly borinic acids can be made from oxidizing trialkyl borane starting materials [R3B] with exposure to moist air, or treatment with iodine, which makes a dialkyliodoborane [R2BI].  Hydrolysis then results in the boronic acid (R2BOH).  Trialkylborates [(RO)3B] or trialkoxyboroxine [(ROBO)3] can be reduced to borinic acid by us of a Grignard reagent.  Grignard reagents can also reduce a boronic ester [RB(OR')2] to a borinic ester.

Bu3B + N2CHCOR → BuCH=C(R)OBBu2

Bu3B + CH2=CHCOCH3 → BuCH2CH=C(CH3)OBBu2

RCOC2H5 + R2BOTf → RC(OBR2)=CHCH3

(Tf = Trifluoromethanesulfonate)

(Z)-Enolates give syn aldol product when reacted with an aldehyde, whereas (E)-enolates give and anti aldol products.

Dialkyl boron chloride (R2BCl) with tertiary amine react with ketones to form an enol borinate.

A trialkoxyborane can react with lithium containing organic molecules to eliminate lithium and one or two alkoxy groups to make boronic and borinic esters.

Purification of the mixtures that result from the reactions is required, as often boronic esters will also be produced and mixed in with the borinic esters.  The method of Letsinger is to dissolve the mixture in ether and precipitate the borinic ester by forming a complex with ammonia. Treatment with ethanolamine ends up making an aminoetylborinate.

Compounds

2-APB

2-Aminoethoxydiphenyl borate (2-APB) inhibits transient receptor potential channels. This kind of inhibition, particularly inhibition of TRPM7, is being studied to find treatments for prostate cancer. 2-APB can work as a catalyst to add an alkyl group from an alkyl halide to a polyol or carbohydrate that contains a cis-vicinal diol to a precise position.  It does this by first combining with the two hydroxy groups to make a ring containing OCCOB−. It can also calatlyse acid chloride or chloroformate reaction a specific region of the diol.

Diphenylborinic acid
Diphenylborinic acid was discovered in 1894 by Michaelis who produced it by hydrolyzing the chloride. Letsinger determined its properties in 1955.

Diphenylborinic acid has an extra high affinity for catechols compared with carbohydrates.

Diphenylborinic acid can catalyse the condensation of pyruvic acids with aldehydes to yield substituted isotetronic acid.

Diphenylborinic acid is an inhibitor of several enzymes such as α-chymotrypsin, subtilisin BPN', and trypsin.

Borinate radical
Borinate radicals (RR'BO·) can be formed from peroxyborinate decomposition.

Other compounds
Other compounds include methoxy(dimethyl)borane, methoxy(methyl)boron, methoxy(methylidene)borane (with a C=B double bond).

[C5H5BR]− uses a B− to be equivalent to carbon in an aromatic benzene like ring. This too is called borinate. The 1-methyl and 1-phenyl borinates can form some of the few organo-thallium(I) compounds.

HB(C6F5)2 + phosphino alcohol → tBu2P+HCH2C(CH3)2OB−H(C6F5)2 → H2 + tBu2PCH2C(CH3)2OB(C6F5)2 and same for tBu2PCH2C(CF3)2OB(C6F5)2

di-Tris(tert-butoxy)siloxy borinic acid HOB[OSi(O(t)Bu)3]2 can be made from tributoxyborate and tributoxysiloxane.  It can form a very complex crystal with Cp2Zr(Me)[OB[OSi(O(t)Bu)3]2]2.

Diborinic acids have two RBOH groups linked together by an organic connection such as diphenyl or phenyl.

Applications
1,1,1,3,3,3-Hexafluoroisopropylbis(pentafluorophenyl)borinate can greatly increase solubility of LiF by complexing the F− anion. This has potential to improve lithium batteries.

Borinic esters are being researched as bacterial growth inhibitors due to their ability to disable some bacterial enzymes such as menaquinone methyltransferase and CcrM. This may result in development of treatments for topical application on skin.

References

Extra reading
 Review of use borinic acids as a catalyst

Organoboron compounds